The Bristol Thor, latterly Bristol Siddeley BS.1009 Thor, was a  diameter ramjet engine developed by Bristol Aero Engines (later Bristol Siddeley Engines) for the Bristol Bloodhound anti-aircraft missile.

Although Bristol Aero Engines acquired ramjet technology from the US company Marquardt, BAE put considerable effort into developing the Thor unit, including the construction of a high altitude test plant (HATP) at their Patchway site, with a supersonic test cell.

The Bloodhound Mk.1 could attain a speed of Mach 2.2, while the Mk.2 was capable of just over Mach 2.7.

Variants
BT.1 Thor
BT.2 Thor
BT.4 Thor
BS.1009 Thor

Specifications (BT.2 Thor)

Notes

References

Ramjet engines
Thor